Kådisbellan (The Condom Slingshot) is a 1989 Swedish autobiography written by Roland Schütt. The book is about Schütt's life as child during the 1920s. His mother Zipa sells condoms, which was forbidden then, and Roland steals the condoms and makes slingshots and balloons of them. A film based on the novel, directed by Åke Sandgren, was released in 1993.

References

1989 novels
Swedish autobiographies
Swedish novels adapted into films